The Local Government Act 1948 was an Act of the Parliament of the United Kingdom. It was passed during the Labour government of Clement Attlee.

This Act provided for general unearmarked grants to be provided to local authorities “as nearly as possible on the basis of financial need.” It established Exchequer Equalisation Grants (EEG) as the new block grant for local authorities. As noted by Ken Young and Nirmala Rao, these new grants were based on “the ratio between the average rateable value per head in each local authority and the average rateable value per head throughout the country.” The purpose of the EEG formula was to ensure that no local authority would fall below a national minimum of financial resources.

Section 132 of the Act allowed local authorities to spend up to the product of a 6d rate for the provision of music, drama, entertainment, and other cultural endeavours. According to Janet Minihan,

“Section 132 at last eliminated the need for special enabling legislation and gave local authorities uniform opportunities to encourage cultural activities throughout their districts.”

External links
Text of Act as originally enacted

Notes

United Kingdom Acts of Parliament 1948